Silanes are saturated chemical compounds with the empirical formula SixHy. They are hydrosilanes, a class of compounds that includes compounds with Si-H and other Si-X bonds. All contain tetrahedral silicon and terminal hydrides.  They only have Si–H and Si–Si single bonds. The bond lengths are 146.0 pm for a Si–H bond and 233 pm for a Si–Si bond. The structures of the silanes are analogues of the alkanes, starting with silane, the analogue of methane, continuing with disilane , the analogue of ethane, etc. They are mainly of theoretical or academic interest.

Inventory

The simplest isomer of a silane is the one in which the silicon atoms are arranged in a single chain with no branches. This isomer is sometimes called the n-isomer (n for "normal", although it is not necessarily the most common). However the chain of silicon atoms may also be branched at one or more points. The number of possible isomers increases rapidly with the number of silicon atoms. 
The members of the series (in terms of number of silicon atoms) follow:
silane,  - one silicon and four hydrogen
disilane,  - two silicon and six hydrogen, ethane-like structure
trisilane,  - three silicon and 8 hydrogen, propane-like structure
tetrasilane,  - four silicon and 10 hydrogen (one isomer: isotetrasilane, analogous to butane and isobutane)
pentasilane,  - five silicon and 12 hydrogen (two isomers: isopentasilane and neopentasilane)
Silanes are named by adding the suffix -silane to the appropriate numerical multiplier prefix. Hence, disilane, ; trisilane ; tetrasilane ; pentasilane ; etc. The prefix is generally Greek, with the exceptions of nonasilane which has a Latin prefix, and undecasilane and tridecasilane which have mixed-language prefixes. Solid phase polymeric silicon hydrides  called polysilicon hydrides are also known.  When hydrogen in a linear polysilene polysilicon hydride is replaced with alkyl or aryl side-groups, the term polysilane is used.

3-Silylhexasilane, H3SiSiH2SiH(SiH3)SiH2SiH2SiH3, is the simplest chiral binary noncyclic silicon hydride.

Cyclosilanes also exist.  They are structurally analogous to the cycloalkanes, with the formula SinH2n, n > 2.

Production 
Early work was conducted by Alfred Stock and Carl Somiesky. Although monosilane and disilane were already known, Stock and Somiesky discovered, beginning in 1916, the next four members of the SinH2n+2 series, up to n = 6. They also documented the formation of solid phase polymeric silicon hydrides. One of their synthesis methods involved the hydrolysis of metal silicides. This method produces a mixture of silanes, which required separation on a high vacuum line.  

The silanes (SinH2n+2) are less thermally stable than alkanes (CnH2n+2). They tend to undergo dehydrogenation, yielding hydrogen and polysilanes. For this reason, the  isolation of silanes higher than heptasilane has proved difficult. 

The Schlesinger process is used to prepare silanes by the reaction of perchlorosilanes with lithium aluminium hydride.

Applications 

The single but significant application for SiH4 is in the microelectronics industry.  By metal organic chemical vapor deposition, silane is converted to silicon by thermal decomposition:
SiH4 → Si + 2 H2

Hazards 
Silane is explosive when mixed with air (1 – 98% SiH4). Other lower silanes can also form explosive mixtures with air. The lighter liquid silanes are highly flammable; this risk increases with the length of the silicon chain.

Considerations for detection/risk control:
Silane is slightly denser than air (possibility of pooling at ground levels/pits)
Disilane is denser than air (possibility of pooling at ground levels/pits)
Trisilane is denser than air (possibility of pooling at ground levels/pits)

Nomenclature

The IUPAC nomenclature (systematic way of naming compounds) for silanes is based on identifying hydrosilicon chains. Unbranched, saturated hydrosilicon chains are named systematically with a Greek numerical prefix denoting the number of silicons and the suffix "-silane".

IUPAC naming conventions can be used to produce a systematic name.

The key steps in the naming of more complicated branched silanes are as follows:
Identify the longest continuous chain of silicon atoms
Name this longest root chain using standard naming rules
Name each side chain by changing the suffix of the name of the silane from "-ane" to "-anyl", except for "silane" which becomes "silyl"
Number the root chain so that the sum of the numbers assigned to each side group will be as low as possible
Number and name the side chains before the name of the root chain

The nomenclature parallels that of alkyl radicals.

Silanes can also be named like any other inorganic compound; in this naming system, silane is named silicon tetrahydride. However, with longer silanes, this becomes cumbersome.

See also
 Organosilicon compounds, compounds containing carbon–silicon bonds
 Hydrosilanes, a larger class of compounds with the formula HmSiRn (m ≠ 0)

References 

pl:Krzemowodory